Aquaporin 3 (AQP-3) is the protein product of the human AQP3 gene. It is found in the basolateral cell membrane of principal collecting duct cells and provides a pathway for water to exit these cells. Aquaporin-3 is also permeable to  glycerol, ammonia, urea, and hydrogen peroxide. It is expressed in various tissues including the skin, respiratory tract, and kidneys as well as various types of cancers. In the kidney, aquaproin-3 is unresponsive to the antidiuretic hormone vasopressin, unlike aquaporin-2. This protein is also a determinant for the GIL blood group system.

Suberoylanilide hydroxamic acid (SAHA) (a HDAC inhibitor) increases expression of aquaporin-3 in normal skin cells (keratinocytes).

Clinical significance
Aquaporin 3 levels are often lower in psoriasis than in healthy skin.

Aquaporin 3 is expressed more in atopic eczema.

Recent studies indicate that aquaporin 3 is overexpressed in many types of malignancies such as melanoma and primary effusion lymphomas as well as cancers of the lung, colon, stomach, esophagus, mouth, liver, and pancreatic duct. Based on these as well as cell culture studies, it is suggested that this overexpression contributes to the growth and spread of at least some of these cancers and therefore may be a therapeutic target for the treatment of these cancers.

See also
 Aquaporin

References

Further reading

External links
 GIL blood group system at BGMUT Blood Group Antigen Gene Mutation Database at NCBI, NIH
 

Integral membrane proteins
Blood proteins
Transfusion medicine
Blood antigen systems